Myosotella myosotis, common name the mouse ear snail, is a European species of small salt marsh snail, a terrestrial pulmonate gastropod mollusk in the family Ellobiidae.

Description
For terms see gastropod shell.

The shell is yellowish to brownish, smooth or with fine striation. It is shiny. There are 7-8 slightly convex whorls. The apertural margin is white and usually with a white layer at the parietal side. The parietalis is very strong and horizontal and often a small second parietalis is present. The columellaris is strong and the umbilicus is usually covered. The form denticulata has 3-6 short and thin folds (like drops) near the palatal margin at the inner lip.

Molecular phylogenetics
The complete nucleotide sequence of the mitochondrial genome of Myosotella myosotis has been available since 2008.

Distribution 
As a native snail this species is found in the following countries and islands:
 Belgium
 Netherlands
 Great Britain
 Ireland
 Mediterranean Sea coasts (Spain, Italy, Istria, Dalmatia, Albania, Greece, West and South Turkey), West European coasts to Ireland and Scotland, Black Sea, North Germany (and Baltic Sea).

As an exotic, this species is found on:
 The West Coast of North America
 The East Coast of North America

Description 
The maximum recorded shell length is 12 mm.

Habitat 
This species lives right at sea level (at the highest high-tide level), and so therefore the minimum recorded depth for this species is 0 m, and the maximum recorded depth is 0 m.

Synonyms

 Alexia (Auricula) myosotis (Draparnaud, 1801)
 Alexia (Auricula) myosotis var. hiriarti de Folin, 1889 
 Alexia (Leuconia) micheli var. elongata Pallary, 1900 
 Alexia (Leuconia) micheli var. incrassata Pallary, 1900 
 Alexia algerica Bourguignat, 1864 
 Alexia balearica Dohrn & Heynemann, 1862 
 Alexia cossoni Bourguignat, 1887 
 Alexia enhalia Bourguignat, 1887 
 Alexia loweana Pfeiffer, 1866 
 Alexia myosotis (Draparnaud, 1801)
 Alexia myosotis var. varicosa Fenaux, 1939 
 Alexia obsoleta Pfeiffer, 1854 
 Alexia parva Locard, 1893 
 Alexia pechaudi Bourguignat, 1887 
 Auricula (Alexia) meridionalis Brazier, 1877 
 Auricula biasolettiana Küster, 1844 
 Auricula botteriana Philippi, 1846 
 Auricula ciliata Morelet, 1845 
 Auricula dubia Cantraine, 1835 
 Auricula kutschigiana Küster, 1844 
 Auricula meridionalis Brazier, 1877
 Auricula microstoma Küster, 1844 
 Auricula myosotis Draparnaud, 1801
 Auricula myosotis var. adriatica Küster, 1844 
 Auricula myosotis var. elongata Küster, 1844 
 Auricula tenella Menke, 1830 
 Auricula veneta Martens, 1884 
 Auricula venetiensis Megerle von Mühlfeld in Villa A. & G.B., 1841 
 Auricula vespertina Morelet, 1860 
 Auricula watsoni Wollaston, 1878
 Melampus turritus W. G. Binney, 1859(junior synonym)
 Melampus gracilis Lowe, 1832 
 Myosotella denticulata (Montagu, 1803) ·
 Ovatella myosotis (Draparnaud, 1801)
 Ovatella myosotis salentina Palazzi & Curini Galletti, 1982 
 Phytia letourneuxi var. tanousi Pallary, 1912 
 Phytia myosotis (Draparnaud, 1801)
 Tralia (Alexia) myosotis (Draparnaud, 1801) 
 Tralia (Alexia) myosotis f. junior Dall, 1885 
 Voluta denticulata Montagu, 1803 (original combination)
 Voluta ingens W. Turton, 1819 
 Voluta reflexa W. Turton, 1819
 Voluta ringens W. Turton, 1819

References

  Draparnaud. 1801. Tableau des Mollusques terrestres et fluviatiles de la France. Montpellier et Paris, 116 p,

External links
Myosotella myosotis  at Animalbase
Myosotella denticulata at Mollusc Ireland
IUCN Red List
 Image and info in Dutch at: 
 Info as an exotic: 

Ellobiidae
Gastropods described in 1801